Muideen is a Nigerian masculine given name. Notable people with the name include:

Muideen Akanji (born 1992), Nigerian boxer 
Muideen Ganiyu (born 1979), Nigerian boxer 

African given names